Our Lady of Lourdes Shrine (French: Sanctuaire Notre-Dame de Lourdes) is a famous Marian shrine located in Villianur Town, Puducherry, India.  This Roman Catholic shrine is devoted to Our Lady of Lourdes.

The venerated Marian image enshrined within  received a Pontifical decree on 21 February 1886 from Pope Leo XIII to declare the site an official Shrine of Our Lady of Lourdes and to canonically crown the statue.

History

In 1867, the MEP missionaries in Puducherry wished to build a Chapel at Villianur which is 13 kilometers from Pondicherry, on the road to Villupuram. Hence they bought a piece of land at Villianur and Rev.Fr.Gou, then procurator of the Puducherry mission after a long negotiation with the Hindu temple authorities of Thirukameswarer Gogilambigai Temple started to build a Chapel at Kanuvapet on the outskirts of Villianur. It is said that the building of the church was sponsored by the thanksgiving offering of Dr.Lephine's family for the miraculous cure of his daughter.

It took 10 years to complete the chapel. And Rev.Fr.Tarbes a cousin brother of St. Bernadette, the visionary of Lourdes, was appointed as the Parish Priest of Villianur mission. Since he had a direct report of the apparitions of Our Lady of Lourdes, this chapel is the first in the world to be named after Our Lady of Lourdes outside Lourdes, France.

A parishioner of Our Lady of Lourdes commissioned a six foot tall statue for the site, which arrived in Puducherry on 4 April 1877.  The box containing the statue was dropped three times on the way to the cathedral, but arrived intact, and was sent on to Villianur.

The statue was claimed to be associated with a number of miracles in the late nineteenth century.  In 1885 the archbishop Laouënan went to Rome and provided a report of the alleged miracles that took place at the shrine to Pope Leo XIII.  The Archbishop received the Pontifical decree on 21 February 1886 to declare the site an official Shrine of Our Lady of Lourdes and to canonically crown the statue.

On the archbishop's return from Rome on 8 May 1886, a pontifical high mass was held, with the celebration being witnessed by around 40,000 people.  At the mass, the archbishop crowned the statue in the name of the pope, and declared the church as the Shrine of Our Lady of Lourdes, Villianur, attaching permanent plenary indulgences to the shrine.

Pond

There was a natural pond in front of the chapel. it was once used as the water reservoir for the irrigation of the lands around and water came from the big Ousteri Lake which is 10 km away from here. And this pond was constructed by Fr. Lesbond, the Parish Priest, with donations from Zigon organized by Mr. Lesage. Mr. Larocgue from the people in Zigon got a statue from Lourdes and in 1924 and a solemn ceremony took place to install the statue in the middle of the sacred pond after the due consecration of the statue and the pond.

It is believed by the people here that the pond water is miraculous and has the ability to cure the sick and bring good fortune. This is the only Catholic church in Asia having a sacred pond in front of the church.

The grotto
19 years after Lourdes apparitions, the first church and grotto for Our Lady of Lourdes was constructed in 1877. The centenary celebrations was celebrated on 10 September 1977. As a remembrance of the centenary celebrations, Rev.Fr.Duissen built a big grotto in the garden of the church, which was consecrated by bishop Venmani S. Selvanather on 10 October 1978. The grotto which was inside the church was modified according as per the instruction of the Second Vatican Council.

The 125th Anniversary Celebrations
On 8 October 2011, on the 125th anniversary of the crowning of the statue by the Pope, Archbishop  Antony Anandarayar re-crowned the image with a diamond crown donated by devotees.

Annual feast
Annual feast of Our Lady of Lourdes shrine commence with the nine days of Novena and flag hoisting on the 6th day after Easter Sunday. The car procession is done during these days. The feast day is on the 15th day after Easter. This is a Puducherry state Christian festival.

The Holy Water from Lourdes
Every first Saturday in the month of August, The Holy Water from Lourdes Church, France is poured into the 'Sacred Pond' at Villianur Shrine. This event is attended by thousands of devotees every year.

Pilgrimage on foot
As a sign of gratitude to Our Lady, for saving the city from a cyclone, the first pilgrimage on foot took place on 10 October 1977 from Pondicherry and this tradition is still continued on the second Saturday in the month of October. It starts from Immaculate Conception Cathedral, Pondicherry and ends in the shrine covering approximately 12 km.

Gallery

See also
 Roman Catholic Archdiocese of Pondicherry and Cuddalore
 Our Lady of Lourdes

External links
 Official Website
 CatholicChurches.in Directory
 http://www.pondicherryarchdiocese.org/PARKEDDOMAINS/villianur.org/

Roman Catholic churches in Puducherry
Shrines to the Virgin Mary
Roman Catholic churches completed in 1877
Archdiocese of Pondicherry and Cuddalore
Roman Catholic shrines in India
19th-century Roman Catholic church buildings in India
1877 establishments in the French colonial empire